[[File:Roger Fenton - L'Entente cordiale - Google Art Project.jpg|thumb|350px|L'Entente Cordiale (1855) by Roger Fenton]]L'Entente Cordiale''''' is a black-and-white photograph by English photographer Roger Fenton, taken in 1855. The picture was part of the large number taken by Fenton during the Crimea War, where he was one of the first war photographers.

History and description
The Crimea War started in October 1853 between Russia and the Ottoman Empire, who was joined the following year by France and the United Kingdom. The British public opinion had a negative view of the war, so Queen Victoria invited Fenton to document the war with his photographic work, to give a more favourable view of the conflict. Fenton arrived in Balaklava, Crimea, and moved to Sevastopol, on March 1855, to document the ongoing siege. The English photographer attempted to portray the conflict in a positive way, and took pictures of members of the allied armies, both soldiers, officer and generals, of local landscapes and also of the set of the battlefields, often deserted.

The scenes depicting soldiers are often staged, like the current one, which depicts the confraternization between British and French soldiers. They aren't easily distinguishable, because their uniforms are similar. Eight members of both armies are seen together in a leisure occasion. They all pose for the photographer, some are standing or seated, the soldier at the center of the composition, seated in a wooden barrell fills the glass of another one at his right. Others smoke the pipe and the one seated at the right reads a newspaper. A hut his visible behind him, while two horses are seen in the hillside pasture, which serves as background of the scene.

The artificiality of the scene doesn't detract of the real comradeship experienced by members of both armies during the war. The National Army Museum website states that "In fact, the friendly atmosphere it portrays seems to have matched reality. There were many instances of British and French soldiers enjoying time together and, by the time the photograph was taken, the bitter Crimean winter was long past and much had been done to improve conditions at the front."

Public collections
There are prints of this photograph at The Royal Collection, the National Army Museum, in London, the Musée d'Orsay, in Paris, the Art Institute of Chicago, the J. Paul Getty Museum, in Los Angeles, the San Francisco Museum of Modern Art, and the National Gallery of Canada, in Ottawa.

References

1850s photographs
1855 in art
Photographs by Roger Fenton
Black-and-white photographs
Works about the Crimean War
Artworks of the Royal Collection of the United Kingdom
Collections of the National Gallery of Canada
Photographs of the Musée d'Orsay
Photographs of the Art Institute of Chicago
Photographs of the J. Paul Getty Museum
Photographs of the San Francisco Museum of Modern Art